On this page you can find all the Romanian clubs that have played in the national leagues in Romania(liga I, II, III), Austria-Hungary/Hungary(liga 1, 2, 3), the Ottoman Empire, Bulgaria or the Russian Empire, by place of residence.

On the first column the first name as the founding name in Romanian, on the second column the name as it appeared in the documents of the time(if the town did not belong to Romania at the time), on the third column the foundation date, in parenthesis - the polisportive club, outside - the football section of the club and on fourth column the date the club was dissolved(if it is the case) and on the fifth column the best place they occupied in the highest league.

Alba County

Arad County

Argeș County

Bacău County

Bihor County

Bistrița-Năsăud County

Botoșani County

Brașov County

Brăila County

Bucharest

Buzău County

Călărași County

Caraș-Severin County

Cernăuți County

Cluj County

Constanța County

Covasna County

Dâmbovița County

Dolj County

Durostor County

Galați County

Giurgiu County

Gorj County

Harghita County

Hunedoara County

Ialomița County

Iași County

Ilfov County

Lăpușna County

Maramureș County

Mehedinți County

Mureș County

Neamț County

Olt County

Prahova County

Sălaj  County

Satu Mare County

Sibiu County

Suceava County

Teleorman County

Timiș County

Tulcea County

Vâlcea County

Vaslui County

Vrancea County

References

clubs by count